The Kyoto Gardens of Honolulu Memorial Park is a cemetery located in the eastern half of the Honolulu Memorial Park, 22 Craigside Place, Honolulu, Hawaii. Its three-tiered Sanju Pagoda, the Kinkaku-ji Temple, and Mirror Gardens are fine examples of Japanese traditional-style structures and gardens built outside Japan. The gardens were listed in the National Register of Historic Places as site 04000020 on February 11, 2004.

Honolulu Memorial Park was established in 1958, and its Buddhist Kinkaku-ji memorial and Sanju Pagoda were constructed between 1964-1966 as part of the Nuuanu Memorial Gardens Funerary Home, adjacent to history Oahu Cemetery. This name was changed to Kyoto Gardens in 1966 when the City of Kyoto, Japan, donated a bronze bell, with Abbot Jikai Murakami of Kyoto's Kinkaku-ji present for the opening.

 The Sanju Pagoda is modeled after the Hokke-ji Temple (Kanji: 南法華寺) in Nara, Japan which was built in the Momoyama Period (1571–1602). The garden replica is built of concrete and steel, and somewhat larger than the original with a height from foundation to rooftop of 80 feet. Including the ku-rin copper spire, its total height is 116 feet.
 The Kinkaku-ji (Kanji: 金閣寺) columbarium is modeled upon the renowned Kinkaku-ji (Golden Pavilion) located on the grounds of the Rokuonji Temple in Kyoto, built in the Muromachi Period (1335–1573). It is three stories tall (38 feet), constructed with steel frame and plaster finish, and with a phoenix finial at its roof peak.
 Mirror Lake Garden, surrounding Kinkaku-ji, also reflects Muromachi Period (1335–1573) garden design.

Both the Sanju Pagoda and Kinkaku-ji serve as columbariums. As of 2006 they were in poor repair, due to the cemetery's financial difficulties.

References

External links
 

Cemeteries in Hawaii
Cemeteries on the National Register of Historic Places in Hawaii
Buildings and structures in Honolulu
Japanese-American culture in Honolulu
Japanese gardens in the United States
Tourist attractions in Honolulu
National Register of Historic Places in Honolulu